The 2015 EBSA European Under-21 Snooker Championships took place from 21 to 26 March 2015 in Qawra, Malta. The tournament was won by the number 4 seed Darryl Hill of Mannin who defeated England's Louis Heathcote 6–3 in the final to win the championships, as a result Hill was given a two-year card on the professional World Snooker Tour for the 2015/2016 and 2016/2017 seasons.

Results

Round 1
Best of 5 frames

References

2015 in snooker
Snooker amateur tournaments
St. Paul's Bay
2015 in Maltese sport
International sports competitions hosted by Malta